"Sing Hallelujah to the Lord" is a 1974 contemporary Christian worship song composed by Linda Stassen-Benjamin (born 1951) notable for its simplicity and popularity in many languages.

Origin
The song was fully composed at a workshop at Calvary Chapel Costa Mesa, though the tune reportedly came to the songwriter while taking a shower, before she then took the tune to the composition group to work on harmonies. The song is in a minor key, which is unusual for a praise song. 

It is unclear how many stanzas the song originally had, with some sources saying only one. In one popular form it is a four stanza song themed as an Easter hymn for Resurrection Sunday, and the four stanzas are derived from simple repeated statements from the Bible found in early Christian liturgies.

Use in protests 
"Sing Hallelujah to the Lord" has been used as a protest song during the 2019–20 Hong Kong protests.  It is sung by many Christians and non-Christians in the protests. Under Hong Kong's Public Order Ordinance, religious gatherings are exempt from the definition of a "gathering" or "assembly" and therefore more difficult to police.

Non-English-language versions
French: "Chante alléluia au Seigneur"
Spanish: "Canta aleluya al Señor"

See also
"We Shall Overcome", another hymn used as a protest song.

References

1974 songs
Contemporary Christian songs